Communauté d'agglomération Tulle Agglo is the communauté d'agglomération, an intercommunal structure, centred on the town of Tulle. It is located in the Corrèze department, in the Nouvelle-Aquitaine region, central France. Created in 1993, its seat is in Tulle. Its area is 868.1 km2. Its population was 44,658 in 2019, of which 14,812 in Tulle proper.

Composition
The communauté d'agglomération consists of the following 43 communes:

Les Angles-sur-Corrèze
Bar
Beaumont
Chamboulive
Chameyrat
Champagnac-la-Prune
Chanac-les-Mines
Chanteix
Le Chastang
Clergoux
Cornil
Corrèze
Espagnac
Eyrein
Favars
Gimel-les-Cascades
Gros-Chastang
Gumond
Ladignac-sur-Rondelles
Lagarde-Marc-la-Tour
Lagraulière
Laguenne-sur-Avalouze
Le Lonzac
Naves
Orliac-de-Bar
Pandrignes
Pierrefitte
La Roche-Canillac
Saint-Augustin
Saint-Clément
Sainte-Fortunade
Saint-Germain-les-Vergnes
Saint-Hilaire-Peyroux
Saint-Jal
Saint-Martial-de-Gimel
Saint-Mexant
Saint-Pardoux-la-Croisille
Saint-Paul
Saint-Priest-de-Gimel
Saint-Salvadour
Seilhac
Tulle
Vitrac-sur-Montane

References

Tulle
Tulle